Colin Harvey (11 November 1960 – 15 August 2011) was a British science fiction writer, editor, and reviewer who was born in Cornwall, England. Harvey died after having a stroke.

Works

Novels
Vengeance (2001)
Lightning Days (2006)
The Silk Palace (2007)
Blind Faith (2008)
Winter Song (2009)
Damage Time (2010)

Collections
Most of Harvey's short works are found in the 2009 collection Displacement.

Anthologies
Harvey edited four anthologies:
Killers (2008)
Future Bristol (2009)
Dark Spires (2010)
Transtories (2011)

Awards
Harvey was nominated for both the British Fantasy Award and the Black Quill Award for editing the anthology Killers.

References

External links

1960 births
2011 deaths
20th-century British novelists
21st-century British novelists
Alumni of Bath Spa University
British science fiction writers
Writers from Cornwall